Tiptonville is a town in and the county seat of Lake County, Tennessee, United States. Its population was 2,439 as of the 2000 census and 4,464 in 2010, showing an increase of 2,025. It is also home to the Northwest Correctional Complex, a maximum security prison, known for once housing mass murderer Jessie Dotson.

History
Tiptonville was established in 1857, but was not incorporated until 1900. It was designated the county seat when Lake County was created in 1870.

Tiptonville was the scene of the surrender of Confederate forces at the end of the 
1862 Battle of Island Number Ten in the American Civil War. The monument for this battle is located on State Route 22 approximately three miles north of Tiptonville, since the island itself, the focal point of the battle, has been eroded by the flow of the Mississippi River and no longer exists.

On March 19, 1901, Tiptonville was destroyed by a fire three days after a mob of white townsmen had lynched Ike Fitzgerald, a black man accused of raping a white woman.  Whites speculated that the blaze, which burned 30 buildings and residences, including all of the stores on the main street, had been deliberately set by African Americans in reprisal for Fitzgerald's lynching.

Geography

Tiptonville is located at  (36.377610, −89.476022), on a small rise known as the Tiptonville Dome and within the New Madrid Seismic Zone.  The Mississippi River is to the west and north, the Kentucky Bend is to the north, and Reelfoot Lake is to the east.

Demographics

As of the census of 2000, there were 2,439 people, 918 households, and 570 families residing in the town. The population density was 1,704.0 people per square mile (658.5/km2). There were 992 housing units at an average density of 693.1 per square mile (267.8/km2). The racial makeup of the town was 62.57% White, 36.16% African American, 0.33% Native American, 0.08% Asian, 0.12% from other races, and 0.74% from two or more races. Hispanic or Latino of any race were 0.82% of the population.

There were 918 households, out of which 26.8% had children under the age of 18 living with them, 38.5% were married couples living together, 19.4% had a female householder with no husband present, and 37.9% were non-families. 35.2% of all households were made up of individuals, and 19.1% had someone living alone who was 65 years of age or older. The average household size was 2.23 and the average family size was 2.87.

In the town, the population was spread out, with 20.7% under the age of 18, 9.4% from 18 to 24, 28.3% from 25 to 44, 23.2% from 45 to 64, and 18.4% who were 65 years of age or older. The median age was 40 years. For every 100 females, there were 102.7 males. For every 100 females age 18 and over, there were 103.9 males.

The median income for a household in the town was $19,475, and the median income for a family was $24,929. Males had a median income of $25,089 versus $18,333 for females. The per capita income for the town was $11,843. About 21.1% of families and 26.5% of the population were below the poverty line, including 43.0% of those under age 18 and 28.7% of those age 65 or over.

Media
A local newspaper, The Lake County Banner, is published in Tiptonville.

Education
 Lake County High School

Notable people
 Clifton Cates (1893–1970), 19th Commandant of the U.S. Marine Corps
 Carl Perkins, musician
 Jerry Reese, former general manager of the New York Giants

See also

 List of municipalities in Tennessee

References

External links

 
 Reelfoot Lake Area Chamber of Commerce

Towns in Lake County, Tennessee
Towns in Tennessee
Tennessee populated places on the Mississippi River
County seats in Tennessee